Receptor-binding cancer antigen expressed on SiSo cells is a protein that in humans is encoded by the EBAG9 gene.

This gene was identified as an estrogen-responsive gene. Regulation of transcription by estrogen is mediated by estrogen receptor which binds to the estrogen-responsive element (ERE) found in the 5'-flanking region of this gene. The encoded protein is a tumor-associated antigen that is expressed at high frequency in a variety of cancers. Two transcript variants differing in the 5' UTR, but encoding the same protein, have been identified for this gene.

References

Further reading